FPSB may refer to:

Economy and Trade 
 Financial Planning Standards Board, the owner of the Certified Financial Planner mark outside the United States
 Financial Planning Standards Board India, an unrelated Indian public-private enterprise
 First-price sealed-bid auction, a type of auction where bidders submit a bid in a concealed fashion

Education 
 Future Problem Solving Program, an international academic competition